The Battle of Lubieszów (Battle of Lubieszów Lake), occurred on April 17, 1577, was the most important battle in the two-year Danzig Rebellion fought between the forces loyal to the newly elected King Stefan Batory of the Polish–Lithuanian Commonwealth and the Commonwealth's richest city, Danzig (Gdańsk), following the city's refusal to accept the election of Batory as monarch of the Commonwealth which had taken place on December 15, 1575. The battle took place to the west of the town of Tczew (Dirschau), southeast of Gdansk on the left bank of the Vistula river, near Lubieszów Lake (present name Lubiszewo Lake) and the modern village of Lubiszewo Tczewskie. While it was not a decisive victory insofar as Gdansk itself was not taken and the war raged on, the city, having lost much of its wealthy citizenry, did finally to come to terms with the king at the end of the year.

The city's army, led by the mercenary German commander Jan Winkelbruch (Hans Winckelbruch or Winckelburg von Kölln), was about 7,000–12,000 strong (including mercenaries, among them a Scottish regiment which did not participate in the battle itself), but with less than 1,000 cavalry. The city's army was utterly defeated by the army of Jan Zborowski (of about 2,000 men, half of them cavalry). The Danzigers, who lost over half of their army to casualties and surrender, were forced to retreat behind the walls, and thus the Siege of Danzig (1577) began.

Initial Moves
The campaign leading up to the battle began in August 1576; Batory marched with 2,000 men to Malbork, east of Tczew in order to isolate Gdańsk from the surrounding countryside. The following January he took the town of Tczew, and successively stormed the rebel defenses at Głowa and Garabina. The last of these was a mere  from Gdańsk and its fall to the king cut the city off by land. The king then left the army under command of hetman Jan Zborowski, ordering a blockade to isolate the city by sea as well, with Polish privateers fighting both the Gdańsk and Danish fleets.

Opposing Forces
The winter reduced military action to minor skirmishing and the spring thaw halted all military engagements, but during this lull, the city magnates hired the German mercenary captain Hans Winckelbruch von Kölln, who, in April, marched out to engage the Polish army at Lubieszów, near Tczew. The Polish army consisted of 1000 infantry (primarily Hungarians and Wallachians) and 1,300 cavalry, while Winckelbruch's force was made up of 3,100 landsknechts, 400 mercenary reiter cavalry, 400 city cavalry, and 6,000–8,000 militiamen, in total 10–12,000 soldiers. He also brought 7 cannon and 30 light cannon mounted on wagons. On hearing of Winckelbruch's advance, hetman Zborowski marched all but 100 infantry out of Tczew to attack the Gdańsk army, crossing the Motława River (a tributary of the Vistula then swollen with the spring thaw) at Rokitki, while Winckelbruch sent a force of 200 to delay the Commonwealth army as he tried to flank it and cross the Motława between two lakes to the south of the town of Lubieszów itself, west south west of Rokitki. While scouts informed Zborowski of the flanking move, two standards of cavalry he sent out to stop them were unable to stop Winckelbruch's crossing.  Upon hearing of the failure to dislodge Winckelbruch from his left flank, Zborowski ordered the bridge at Roktiki destroyed and sent all of his forces to the west to engage Winckelbruch at the lakes.

The battle
The battle started in earnest with Polish-Hungarian infantry advancing, crouching at first to avoid withering enemy fire, to capture a battery of Gdańsk artillery, which was then turned to fire on the Danzig army. Winckelbruch ordered the landsknechts to attack with pikes, but they were repelled by the king's infantry who charged them with sabers. The landsknechts held their ground before the enemy infantry but finally broke when another two companies of Polish hussars attacked them in the flank. With this, the entire Danzig army broke and fled, and the Polish cavalry kept up the chase right to the Danzig city gates. Danzig's losses amounted to 4,400 dead and 5,000 taken prisoner, while the king's army suffered 188 casualties, only 88 of them deaths.

The aftermath
The battle, while decisive for the king, did not end Gdańsk's resistance. The king could only reinforce his forces in June, and a raid on July 3 destroyed a third of Batory's artillery park, making direct assault on the city, defended by heavy medieval walls, very difficult. In September, Batory began withdrawing his army to prepare for war with Muscovy. Both sides came to terms in December 1577, with Batory receiving an indemnity of 200,000 Polish złotys while confirming the city's liberties.

Significance
Although it failed to end the wider war, the Battle of Lubieszów is seen to mark the beginning of the heyday of the Polish-Lithuanian hussars, who were so instrumental in sealing the victory that day.

References

Further reading
 
 Sikora Radoslaw, Musialowicz Bartosz, Winged Hussars, BUM Magazine, October 2016.

External links
Battle of Lubieszow,  1577
Map of the battle

Conflicts in 1577
1577 in Europe
Lubieszow, battle of
History of Gdańsk
Lubieszow
Military history of Poland